Python was a steel roller coaster located at Busch Gardens Tampa Bay theme park in Tampa, Florida. Built by Arrow Development and opened on July 1, 1976, it was the first roller coaster at Busch Gardens since the park opened in 1959. The roller coaster was located in the Congo section of the park near Stanley Falls Flume and later the Congo River Rapids. After 30 years of operation, Python closed on October 31, 2006 and was eventually replaced by Jungala, a family section of the park.

Python was one of several Corkscrew models built by Arrow Development, imaged after the likes of Corkscrew at Knott's Berry Farm. Upon opening, the roller coaster was received well by critics and guests.

History 
Following an 18 month expansion of the Busch Gardens Tampa park, which saw the opening of several attractions including the Skyride and Moroccan Village, officials from the company disclosed about planning out the next 18 months of a separate expansion. Reports a day before its formal announcement in September 1975 indicated that a new thrill ride, named "The Python", would be constructed. The roller coaster would cost $2 million dollars as part of a $7.6 million dollar expansion of the park, and was expected to open by the 1976 summer season. In October 1975, the general manager of Busch Gardens Tampa, William Thurman, expected the expansion to be approved by the city of Tampa due to the recent success seen at the Busch Gardens parks.

In January 1976, Thom Stork, the publicity manager for Busch Gardens Tampa, voiced the expansion that included Python would appeal to all ages and carry "the balance we think we need" for the park. By March 1976, it was observed in The Tampa Tribune that materials and plans were being looked over during a visit by the Syrian Ministry of Tourism. Vertical construction was observed to continue between April and May 1976. In the same time frame of its reported construction, it was stated that Python would open in mid-June. Python opened on July 1, 1976, as the first roller coaster at Busch Gardens Tampa. Upon opening, Python became Florida's first roller coaster to feature inversions. 

Rumors of Python closing began in September 2006, as Busch Gardens filed permits to demolish the corner of the Congo section which hosted the roller coaster. The replacement for the roller coaster was further speculated to be part of an  expansion to the Congo section. The original permit for demolishing the section of the park was turned down by city officials wanting a more in-depth plan. On October 28, 2006, the park announced that Python would not reopen for the 2007 season. The ride permanently closed on October 31, 2006 and was removed after 30 years of operation. Along with Python, the area's restaurant were torn down as a part of the Congo renovation. After the demolition of Python, the trains were sent to Busch Gardens Williamsburg for their Arrow Development roller coaster, Loch Ness Monster. Approval for the new section of the park took place on June 14, 2007, which would become Jungala, and later opened on April 5, 2008.

Characteristics 

Python was a stock model roller coaster made by Arrow Development, which was a clone of Knott's Berry Farms defunct Corkscrew roller coaster (which now operates at Silverwood amusement park in Athol, Idaho). The concept for the Corkscrew model took six years for Arrow Development to progress, and was designed by Ron Toomer. 

Python opened as part of an expansion by the park featuring another attraction in the Congo area named "The Monstrous Mamba". Python operated with two trains, with six cars that were arranged two across in two rows seating, allowing for twenty-four riders per train. The trains were colored black and yellow, as the roller coaster was themed to the python snake. The trains featured over-the-head restraints, with riders needing to be 42 inches to ride.

Ride experience 
The train exited the station into a short 180-degree turn to the right and up the  lift hill. Once at the top, the train dipped into a banked turn to the right and descended down into the first drop. Following the drop, the train then ascended a small right-banked hill and into a turn, followed by its double corkscrew element. After the signature double corkscrew element, the train then went through another 180-degree turn to the right, and entered the final brake run where it returned to the station. One cycle of the roller coaster took about a minute to complete.

Incidents

A few weeks after the ride opened, a 39-year-old heart patient died shortly after riding Python. The roller coaster's tagline ("I challenged the Python and lived!") was subsequently removed.

Reception and legacy 
Python garnered positive reviews from guests and critics upon opening. Guests reactions to the ride ranged from excited to afraid, with one guest simply stating "it's a scream" and another calling it "dyn-o-mite!" A staff writer for The Tampa Tribune, Lisa Akchin, stated during her first ride she "had been too scared to scream", but during the third ride, she "was actually enjoying [her]self". By the time she left the roller coaster, she expressed "feeling a little unsteady on [her] feet but exhilarated." A staff member from the St. Petersburg Times, Michael Marzella, framed Python as "more than just a run-of-the-mill daredevil roller coaster" and that it "sends you speeding down at a breathtaking clip." In the same article, Marzella conversed with John C. Allen, a roller coaster designer who explained "every twist, bend and stomach-wrench is carefully designed to create an illusion of danger" and "if you emerge laughing, then the magic worked."

After the opening of Python at Busch Gardens Tampa, attendance for the park increased 12.6% during July 1976 compared to July 1975. The roller coaster's opening was attributed as one of the main factors to the overall 2.5% increase in total attendance for the 1976 season. In the ensuing years of its operation, Python led the way for Busch Gardens Tampa to construct several additional roller coasters at the park.

See also 
 Canobie Corkscrew, another Corkscrew model manufactured by Arrow Development
 Scorpion (roller coaster), the current longest standing roller coaster at Busch Gardens Tampa Bay
 Wabash Cannonball (roller coaster), another Corkscrew model manufactured by Arrow Development

References

External links
 

Former roller coasters in Florida
Busch Gardens Tampa Bay